Fiona Leonora H. Peever, née Winkler (born in 1964), is a British sculptor based in Oxfordshire, England. With her husband and fellow-sculptor Alec Peever, she is a director of Lettering and Sculpture Limited, a sculpture studio. She carves in stone and other materials, and has produced public art, along with art for educational and religious institutions, besides private commissions. She is known for her sculpture of Thomas Attwood in Birmingham (1993), made in collaboration with Siobhan Coppinger. This statue is unusual in that it appears to have stepped down from its soapbox to sit on the steps, seemingly reading some notes.

Background

Fiona's paternal ancestors were mostly Londoners; members of the skilled working class who held responsible positions throughout all or most of their working lives. The family was then joined by Eastern European immigrant Ernest Winkler-Haase (later Ernest Winkler), who brought accountancy skills which heralded a move from East London to Richmond. Fiona's great great grandparents were Charles Hargrave (Marylebone 11 May 1830 – 1920) and Eliza Goymer (Holbrook ca.1835 – 1907). Eliza was the daughter of agricultural labourer John Goymer. Charles started out as a coffee house keeper, then worked as a foreman porter for Midland Railway until he was at least 80 years, describing himself then as a "superannuated railway servant." Fiona's paternal great grandparents (the parents of her father's mother Angela Georgina) were William Thomas Hargrave (Marylebone 12 May 1862 – 1947), a bookstall manager, selling books, newspapers and stationery, and Angela Georgina Hargrave (Hackney, London ca.1866 – 1936). Fiona's paternal grandparents were scientific works accountant Ernest Oscar Winkler-Haase (23 October 1889 – 1978) and Dorothy Marguerite Hargrave (West Ham 29 September 1895 – 1982), who married in West Ham in 1914. In 1939 they were living in St Albans, Hertfordshire. Fiona's parents were John H. Winkler (born 1928) and Christine D. Willis (born 1926), who married in 1954 at St Albans. 
Fiona Leonora H. Winkler was born in Richmond in 1964, and was married in 1985, to her business partner and artistic collaborator, the sculptor Alec Thomas Peever (born 1954). They have been working together since 1983. She graduated in 1984 from City and Guilds of London Art School.

Career

As of 2019, Fiona Peever was based with her husband at their Lettering & Sculpture Limited studio at Ducklington, Oxfordshire. The company was incorporated in 2008. She was initially the company secretary, and she additionally became a director in 2015. She creates art in partnership with her husband Alec Peever, and in cooperation with other artists. She specialises in public art, including large sculptures, stone carving and lettering, and combines traditional with experimental techniques. She uses various materials for her sculptures, including wood, steel and bronze, besides slate, marble and other types of stone.

Architectural carving is one of her specialities, and she has made church and graveyard memorials. She creates poetry trails and installations, besides garden and water features, and many of these are public works. Together with Alec she has shown her work at many exhibitions, and has achieved a number of awards.

Works
The following is a small sample of many commissions which were executed by Fiona in collaboration with Alec and other artists.

Thomas Attwood, Chamberlain Square, Birmingham, 1993
The full title of this sculpture in Chamberlain Square, Birmingham, is Thomas Attwood 1783–1856, Birmingham's first Member of Parliament. It was a collaboration between Sioban Coppinger and Fiona Peever. In this sculpture, the bronze Thomas Attwood, the economist who helped bring about the Reform Act of 1832, has apparently climbed down from his pedestal – or soapbox –  and is sitting on the steps of the amphitheatre, continuing his work. Inscribed on the steps where he has walked are the words, "prosperity," "the vote," and "reform." His scattered notes are titled: Votes for All, Full Employment, and Free Trade. The sculpture has been "said to reflect the values Mr Attwood promoted – reform, vote and prosperity."

The sculpture was removed for safekeeping in 2015, before Birmingham Central Library was demolished in the following year. The statue may be gone until building work is completed, but the brown plaque that commemorates it remains.

Royal Parks waymarkers, 2000
These are stone and metallic pavement markers which guide visitors on the Diana, Princess of Wales Memorial Walk in London. They were created in collaboration with Alec Peever.

Bodleian Library grotesques, Oxford 2007–2009
This project involved a Millennium Myths and Monsters Festival competition in which children designed grotesque carvings to replace weather-worn ones on the Bodleian Library, Oxford. Fiona and Alec Peever developed stone carvings from the children's designs, and they were placed high on the cornice of the library. The nine winning designs are: Wild boar, Dodo, Tweedledum and Tweedledee, J. R. R. Tolkien characters, General Pitt Rivers, Aslan the Lion, Green Man, Sir Thomas Bodley, and Three Men in a Boat. Isobel Hughes, the University of Oxford's head of building conservation, commented: "The grotesques will stare out over Oxford for hundreds of years. I hope the winners will be able to revisit their stone carvings many times, bringing their children and their grandchildren to see them too."

Regarding the view of the carvings from below, Alec Peever said: "It's to do with the foreshortening and the perspective of the figures, and also the way the shadows work in order to create the strength of design that can be understood by the passerby." Dr Sarah Thomas, librarian, said: "They have been beautifully interpreted by the stone carvers who have managed to create grotesques that work as sculptures and yet still capture the original charm of the children's drawings." In 2010 Fiona and Alec received a Grotesques Award from the University of Oxford Estate Services.

Architectural sculpture, Highgate Junior School, 2016
This Junior department of Highgate School in London was designed by Architype in Portland stone to replace the Cholmeley House library, and completed in 2016. Fiona and Alec executed sculptures here, including a chameleon, a centipede, and gargoyles on themes appropriate for children, as well as a painted glass window screen.

Notes

References

External links

1964 births
Living people
20th-century British sculptors
21st-century British sculptors
20th-century English women artists
21st-century English women artists
British architectural sculptors
English women sculptors
Sculptors from London